Xu Zhaoxiao (born March 30, 1965 in Heilongjiang) is a Chinese figure skater. He represented China at the 1980 Winter Olympics, where he placed 16th,  and at the 1984 Winter Olympics, where he placed 18th.

Following his retirement from competitive skating, he became a coach. His former students include Yang Chao, Gao Song, Ma Xiaodong, Wu Jialiang, and An Yang. Most notably, he coaches Jin Boyang, the 2016 and 2017 World bronze medallist, who placed 4th at the 2018 Winter Olympics.

Results

References

 

Chinese male single skaters
Figure skaters at the 1980 Winter Olympics
Figure skaters at the 1984 Winter Olympics
Olympic figure skaters of China
Chinese figure skating coaches
1965 births
Living people
Figure skaters from Heilongjiang
Asian Games medalists in figure skating
Figure skaters at the 1986 Asian Winter Games
Medalists at the 1986 Asian Winter Games
Asian Games bronze medalists for China